Sunil is an Indian film director in Malayalam movies. He has directed more than 15 Malayalam movies. His most popular movies are Maanathe Kottaram, Priyappetta Kukku, Vridhanmaare Sookshikkuka, Bharanakoodam and Alancherry Thambrakkal.

Filmography

Direction

Screenplay
 Red Indians (2001)
 Vanarasena (1996)

Story 
 Priyappetta Kukku (1992)
 Gaandhaari (1993)
 Vanarasena (1996)
 Red Indians (2001)
 Lucky Jokers (2011)

Dialogue
 Red Indians (2001)
 Vanarasena (1996)

References

External links

Malayalam film directors
Malayalam screenwriters
Malayalam playback singers
Living people
Year of birth missing (living people)
Place of birth missing (living people)
Indian male playback singers
20th-century Indian film directors
20th-century Indian singers
Artists from Kozhikode
Film directors from Kerala
21st-century Indian film directors
Screenwriters from Kerala
20th-century Indian male singers